The Ambassador of India to the Republic of Germany is the chief diplomatic representative of India to Germany. The embassy is located in  Tiergartenstraße 17, 10785 Berlin.

The embassy is headed by the Ambassador, while three other consulates located in Frankfurt, Hamburg and Munich are headed by a Consulate general.

The following people have served as Ambassadors to the Federal Republic of Germany.

List of Indian Ambassadors to the Federal Republic of Germany

See also
 Embassy of India, Berlin

References 

Germany
India